The Anaheim Amigos were a charter member American Basketball Association (ABA) team based in Southern California. After their first season in Anaheim, the team moved to Los Angeles to become the Los Angeles Stars. In 1970, it moved to Salt Lake City and became the Utah Stars.

The Amigos were the first professional team in any sport to bill themselves as representing the city of Anaheim, California, and were the only team to do so until the National Hockey League's Mighty Ducks of Anaheim began play in 1993. The California Angels of Major League Baseball played at Anaheim Stadium during the Amigos' existence, but they would not use "Anaheim" in their name until 1997.

Franchise history

Origins
With the founding of the ABA on February 2, 1967, a charter franchise in Anaheim was awarded to Art Kim and James Ackerman for $30,000. A 'name the team' contest resulted in the Amigos name. The team played most of its home games at the Anaheim Convention Center. Five home games were scheduled elsewhere in California and three home games were scheduled in Honolulu, Hawaii. Al Brightman was the first head coach.

1967–68 season

The Amigos' roster was highlighted by guards Les Selvage, Jeff Congdon and Steve Chubin, former NBA player Ben Warley and 7 foot center Larry Bunce. Chubin led the team in scoring and assists and was a fan favorite. Selvage led the league in three-point field goal attempts. Warley led the team in rebounds and was an effective outside shooter. Congdon played well but was traded in mid-season to the Denver Rockets for Willis Thomas. Bunce did not live up to expectations despite his height, but played in the 1968 ABA All-Star Game, as did Warley.

The Amigos were not successful on the court. They lost their first five games, including the first ever ABA game, a 134–129 loss to the Oakland Oaks on the road. After losing two thirds of their first 36 games Brightman was fired and replaced as head coach by Harry Dinnel. During the season the Amigos lost eight straight games in one stretch and had two other stretches of six losses each. The team finished the season with 25 wins and 53 losses, good for fifth place in Western Division but not good enough to make the playoffs.

Move to Los Angeles

The Amigos suffered from poor attendance. They averaged 1,293 fans per home game and their games were broadcast on radio and sometimes on television. However, they lost approximately $500,000 on the season and were sold for $450,000 to James J. Kirst who moved the team to nearby Los Angeles Memorial Sports Arena, where they became the Stars. Kirst also brought in Bill Sharman as the new head coach. Sharman had just completed two years coaching the NBA's San Francisco Warriors, taking them to the playoffs both years. With Sharman associated with the team, they were able to sign 13 of their top 15 draft picks including All-Americans Larry Miller and Merv Jackson. Playing with a roster that contained 8 rookies, Los Angeles finished in 5th place and failed to make the playoffs in 1968-69.
1969-70 started out a little better for the Stars with some new veterans joining the best of the previous seasons returning players, but the team was still out of the playoff picture on March 5 when they were sold to cable television entrepreneur Bill Daniels. Following the sale the team came alive, making the playoffs on the last day of the season. Despite a fourth place finish, Sharman, George Stone, and Mack Calvin led the Stars to the Western Conference Championship. In the 1970 ABA Finals, despite being heavy underdogs, they then stretched the Indiana Pacers to a sixth game before losing.

Move to Salt Lake City, Utah
After the 1969–70 season, the franchise once again relocated, this time to Salt Lake City, and became the Utah Stars.

Season-by-season

|-
|colspan="6" align=center style="background:orange; color:#000000;"| Anaheim Amigos
|-
|1967–68|| 25 || 53 || .321 || ||
|-
|colspan="6" align=center | Los Angeles Stars
|-
|1968–69 || 33 || 45 || .423 || ||
|-
|1969–70 || 43 || 41 || .512 || Won Division SemifinalsWon SemifinalsLost ABA Finals || Los Angeles 4, Dallas 2Los Angeles 4, Denver 1Indiana 4, Los Angeles 2
|-

External links
 LA Stars History & Win/Loss Record

References

 
American Basketball Association teams
Defunct basketball teams in California
Los Angeles Stars
Utah Stars
Basketball teams established in 1968
Sports clubs disestablished in 1970

de:Los Angeles Stars
ja:ロサンゼルス・スターズ